Anna Frida Wiktoria Johansson (born 29 May 1971) is a Swedish politician of the Social Democrats. She was the Minister for Infrastructure in the Swedish Government from 2014 to 2017.

Johansson is chairman of the Social Democrats in Gothenburg Municipality, deputy member of the executive board of the Social Democrats and was deputy municipal commissioner in Gothenburg Municipality from 2009 to 2014.

Johansson was elected to the Swedish Riksdag in the 2014 general election. She was appointed Minister for Infrastructure by newly elected Prime Minister Stefan Löfven on 3 October 2014.

On 26 July 2017, a majority in the Riksdag announced they would put forward a vote of confidence against her. She resigned on 27 July 2017.

She is the daughter of Göran Johansson, who was Mayor of Gothenburg Municipality from 1988 to 1991 and from 1994 to 2009.

References

External links

1971 births
Living people
Women members of the Riksdag
Swedish Ministers for Infrastructure
Women government ministers of Sweden
Members of the Riksdag 2014–2018
Members of the Riksdag 2018–2022
21st-century Swedish politicians
21st-century Swedish women politicians